Ardingly is an English village and civil parish in the Mid Sussex district of West Sussex, England. The 2011 Census recorded a population of 1,936 an increase from 1,833 in 2001.

Heritage
There is mention of a place Ertlyngeleghe, in 1396, which may refer to Ardingly.

St Peter's parish church, towards the western end of the village, dates from the 14th century.

The Big-Upon-Little rock formation is close to a footpath between Ardingly and West Hoathly.

Events
In June the South of England Show early in the month and the London to Brighton cycle event (usually held on Father's Day) attract visitors from a wide area. The South of England Showground hosts regular antiques fairs, some of which have featured on the BBC Television game show Bargain Hunt.

Every four years an international Scout camp is held on the showground, attended by about 3,000 Scouts and Girl Guides from West Sussex and other areas at home and abroad. The most recent event, WS 2017, was held on 5–12 August 2017.  The next WS event, 2021 is being planned for 7–14 August 2021.

Schools

At the southern edge of the village is Ardingly College, an independent school. The village also has a Church of England primary school, St. Peters CE Primary, with about 120 pupils. Most of the children of secondary-school age attend Oathall Community College in Haywards Heath.

Public transport

Ardingly has a low-frequency bus service to the nearby towns of Haywards Heath and Crawley.

Ardingly railway station was opened 1 October 1864 by the London, Brighton and South Coast Railway. The Southern Railway electrified the line in the 1930s but British Railways closed the line and station to passenger trains in 1963. The goods yard and connection to the main line remain open as an ARC Aggregates terminal.

Notable people
Frances Garnet Wolseley, 2nd Viscountess Wolseley, a celebrated horticulturist and gardening author, moved to Culpepers, Ardingly, in 1920 and died there in 1936.
Jon Snow, journalist and television presenter, was born in Ardingly in 1947.

References

Further reading

External links
Ardingly Village Website

 
Villages in West Sussex
Civil parishes in West Sussex